Weidenstetten is a town in the district of Alb-Donau in Baden-Württemberg in Germany.

Geography

Politics

Mayor
 1999–today: Georg Engler (independent)

Notable people
 Hieronymus Emser (1478–1527), Catholic theologian and opponent of Martin Luther
 Eberhard Kölsch (1944–2015), German diplomat and ambassador

Towns twinned with Weidenstetten
Roisel (France)

References

External links 
 

Alb-Donau-Kreis
Towns in Baden-Württemberg
Württemberg